Florence is the capital city of the region of Tuscany, Italy, in the Metropolitan City of Florence.

Florence may also refer to:

Places

Italy 

 Florence Airport in the Italian city
 Republic of Florence, Renaissance-era Tuscan city-state

United States 

 Florence, Alabama
 Florence, Arizona
 Florence, California
 Florence, Colorado
 ADX Florence, a Federal prison
 Florence, Illinois, a village
 Florence, Stephenson County, Illinois, an unincorporated community
 Florence, Indiana
 Florence, Kansas
 Florence, Kentucky
 Florence, Louisiana
 Florence, Maryland
 Florence, Massachusetts
 Florence, Minnesota
 Florence, Mississippi
 Florence, Missouri
 Florence, Montana
 Florence, Nebraska
 Florence, New Jersey
 Florence, New York
 Florence, Madison County, Ohio
 Florence, Oregon
 Florence Municipal Airport
 Florence, Pennsylvania
 Florence, South Carolina
 Florence Regional Airport
 Florence, South Dakota
 Florence, Tennessee
 Florence, Texas
 Florence, Vermont
 Florence, Washington
 Florence (CDP), Wisconsin
 Florence (town), Wisconsin
 Florence-Graham, California

Elsewhere 

 Florence, Nova Scotia, Canada
 Florence, Staffordshire, England

People
 Florence (actor) or Nicolas-Joseph Billot de La Ferrière (1749–1816), French actor
 Florence (given name), a given name (including a list of people with the name)
 Drayton Florence (born 1980), American football player
 Franklin Florence (1934-2023), American civil rights activist
 Gillian Florence, Canadian rugby union player 
 Hércules Florence (1804–1879), French/Brazilian artist and inventor of photography
 Tyler Florence (born 1971), celebrity chef and TV host

Arts, entertainment, and media

Fictional characters
 Florence, a character in The Magic Roundabout, a 1960s–70s children's TV programme
 Florence Jean Castleberry, the titular character of the sitcom Flo
 Florence Johnston, the maid in The Jeffersons

Literature
 Florence, a 1949 play by Alice Childress
 "Florence", a 1994 poem by Patti Smith from Early Work

Music
 Florence (album), a 2015 album by Darren Hayman
 Florence and the Machine, a British indie band

Other arts, entertainment, and media
 Florence (video game), a 2018 interactive novel video game

Ships 
USS Curlew (1862) or SS Florence, a stern-wheel steamer and gunboat
USS Florence (SP-173), a yacht chartered by the US Navy
 Florence (clipper), a clipper which disappeared in 1902
 USS Florence Nightingale (AP-70), a cargo ship which served during World War II

Other uses
 3122 Florence, an Amor asteroid
 Tropical Storm Florence, various storms
 Hurricane Florence, Atlantic storm that caused heavy damage in September 2018

See also 
 Florence County (disambiguation)
 Florence station (disambiguation)
 Florence Township (disambiguation)
 Florence Nightingale (disambiguation)
 New Florence (disambiguation)
 Sainte-Florence (disambiguation)